The Schulich Leader Scholarships is a Canadian and Israeli undergraduate award program that provides scholarships for students enrolled in STEM areas of study.  Established in 2011 following a $100 million gift from Canadian businessman and philanthropist Seymour Schulich and co-administered by the UJA Federation of Greater Toronto, the program was initiated with the goal of producing STEM leaders to strengthen the economic competitiveness of Canada and Israel.  In the inaugural year, 977 high schools and CÉGEPs across Canada put forward a nominee to compete in the annual award competition.  In 2015, 1,250 students were nominated, fifty of whom were selected for the scholarship by one of the twenty participating universities.

Selection process

Canada

In Canada, all secondary schools may submit a single nominee for the award each year, with the exception of CÉGEPs in Québec, which may submit four. To be eligible for the scholarship, nominees must be entrepreneurial-minded and meet two out of three criteria:  outstanding community, business or entrepreneurial leadership; academic excellence; and/or financial need.

Choosing from the pool of nominees who have applied to their institution, each of twenty participating universities select two students to become Schulich Leader Scholarship recipients - one student pursuing undergraduate studies in engineering receives a scholarship valued at $100,000 CAD, while the second scholarship, allocated to a student in one of the other three STEM disciplines, has a $80,000 CAD value. The five university partners that attract the most Nominee applications by deadline are provided an additional eight scholarships to offer: four towards engineering and four towards science and mathematics.

Israel

In addition to the Canadian program, Schulich Leader Scholarships is being carried out at five participating universities in Israel.

In Israel, nominees are evaluated based on similar attributes:  leadership and volunteerism, academic standing, and financial need.

Each university selects ten Schulich Leaders annually: five engineer-based Leaders and five science, technology or mathematics-based Leaders.

Universities and Schulich Leaders

The following university partners distribute Schulich Leader Scholarships:

Canada

British Columbia

Prairies

Ontario

Québec

Maritimes

Israel

References

External links 
 schulichleaders.com

Scholarships in Canada
Student financial aid
Awards established in 2011